Leonardo Koutris (born 23 July 1995) is a Greek professional footballer who plays as a left-back for Ekstraklasa club Pogoń Szczecin.

Club career

Ergotelis
Of Brazilian descent, Koutris started his career from a local amateur team from his hometown of Rhodes, Niki Rodos, where he was spotted by Super League club Ergotelis scouts in 2011. On 28 January 2013, he signed his first professional contract with the club  and made his debut as a substitute in a match against Greek champions Olympiacos on 1 December 2013. Already an international with the Greek U19 and U21 squads, and considered one of the greatest talents at Ergotelis, he renewed his contract with the club on 5 June 2014.

After Ergotelis' relegation to the Football League in the summer of 2015, and despite reported interest from Greek club Panathinaikos, Koutris was one of the 17 players to hold out as part of the club's roster until the very end, which came in January 2016, when Ergotelis officially withdrew from professional competitions, and released all players from their contracts.

PAS Giannina
As a free agent, Koutris signed a three-year contract with Greek Super League club PAS Giannina on 26 January 2016. He scored his first goal for the club on 21 July 2016, during his European debut, netting an extra time away goal against Norwegian club Odd during the third qualifying round of the 2016–17 UEFA Europa League. This goal helped his club advance to the next round for the first time in its history, after winning the two-legged tie 4–3 on aggregate.

On 28 April 2017, he signed a contract with champions Olympiacos for an estimated fee of €600,000.

Olympiacos
On 25 July 2017, Koutris made his debut with the club in a 3–1 away win UEFA game against Partizan. He played all the international games of the club, helping Olympiacos to reach UEFA Champions League group stage, after a year.
On 9 September 2017, he made his debut with the club in the Super League in a 1–1 away draw against Xanthi. In the same month, it was reported that Eintracht Frankfurt and Benfica were tracking Koutris whom Olympiacos were eager to offer a new contract. On 18 November 2017, he scored his first goal with the club, sealing a 2–1 home Super League game against Levadiakos. He was voted MVP of the game.

In November 2018, West Ham United sporting director Mario Husillos reportedly spent the international break watching Koutris with the club considering a move for him. In January 2019, Olympiacos rejected an official bid of Italian club Genoa for Koutris in the range of €5 million.

Loan to Mallorca
On 29 January 2020, Koutris was sent on loan to La Liga club Mallorca. On 15 February 2020, he made his debut the club as a substitute in the first half, replacing Lumor Agbenyenu in a 1–0 win home game against Deportivo Alavés. On 21 February 2020, it was announced he would miss six months after suffering an anterior cruciate ligament injury in a league match against Real Betis.

Loan to Fortuna Düsseldorf
On 2 October 2020, the 2. Bundesliga club announced the acquisition of the 25-year-old left back in the form of a loan until 2022, with a purchase option at the range of €3 million.

Pogoń Szczecin
On 4 December 2022, it was announced he would leave Olympiacos permanently after five-and-a-half years to join Polish side Pogoń Szczecin on a three-and-a-half contract.

International career
On 9 November 2018, Greece's new coach Angelos Anastasiadis called up left-back Koutris for the match against Finland and Estonia for UEFA Nations League. On 15 November 2018, he made his debut in a 1–0 home win game against Finland.

Personal life
Koutris holds both Greek as well as Brazilian citizenship, being born to a Greek father and a Brazilian mother.

Stretcher bearer incident
On 17 October 2015, during an Ergotelis game vs AEL at the AEL FC Arena for the Greek Football League, Koutris was involuntarily involved in a comical incident after having gone down injured by a challenge just outside the penalty area. Unable to stand up, he was roughly loaded onto a stretcher by two stretcher bearers, who proceeded to drop him twice while carrying him outside, before unceremoniously dumping him at the side of the pitch. Ergotelis issued a formal complaint a few hours after the match had ended. The incident video went viral worldwide, and received coverage from major networks, such as BBC and the Telegraph, as well as being shown on The Ellen DeGeneres Show.

Career statistics

Club

Honours

Club
Olympiacos 
Super League Greece: 2019–20
Greek Cup: 2019–20

Individual
Super League Greece Team of the Year: 2016–17

References

External links
 
 
 

1995 births
Living people
People from Rhodes
Association football fullbacks
Association football midfielders
Greek footballers
Greek expatriate footballers
Greece international footballers
Greece under-21 international footballers
Greece youth international footballers
Brazilian people of Greek descent
Greek people of Brazilian descent
Ergotelis F.C. players
PAS Giannina F.C. players
Olympiacos F.C. players
Fortuna Düsseldorf players
Pogoń Szczecin players
Super League Greece players
La Liga players
Football League (Greece) players
2. Bundesliga players

Expatriate footballers in Spain
Expatriate footballers in Germany
Expatriate footballers in Poland
Sportspeople from the South Aegean
Greek expatriate sportspeople in Spain
Greek expatriate sportspeople in Germany
Greek expatriate sportspeople in Poland